Ursvik is a village in Nesodden, Viken, Norway.

Villages in Akershus